Deslauriers is a surname. Notable people with the surname include:

Éric Deslauriers (born 1981), Canadian football player
Hermas Deslauriers (1879–1941), Canadian politician
Jacques Deslauriers (1928-2018), Canadian ice hockey player
Jean Deslauriers (1909–1978), Canadian conductor, violinist and composer
Jeff Deslauriers (born 1984), Canadian ice hockey player
Marcel Deslauriers (1905-1988), Canadian draughts player
Michèle Deslauriers (born 1946), Canadian actress
Nicolas Deslauriers (born 1991), Canadian ice hockey player